A separate peace is a nation's agreement to cease military hostilities with another even though the former country had previously entered into a military alliance with other states that remain at war with the latter country.  For example, at the start of the First World War, Russia was a member, like the United Kingdom and France, of the Triple Entente, which went to war with the Central Powers formed by Germany, Austria-Hungary, the Ottoman Empire, and Bulgaria. After the fall of Russian Tsar Nicholas II and the rise to power of the Bolsheviks, Russia defaulted on its commitments to the Triple Entente by signing a separate peace with Germany and its allies in 1917.  This armistice was followed on 3 March 1918 by the formal signing of the Treaty of Brest-Litovsk.

During the Second World War, from 1941, when the Soviets entered an alliance with the British and the Americans, to the end of the war in 1945, both sides suspected the other of seeking separate peace with Nazi Germany though it did not happen. 

An earlier important example is the Franco-Dutch War of 1672, which France and England entered together, but the English withdrew unilaterally by a separate peace, the 1674 Treaty of Westminster.

Legal obligations not to conclude separate peace
It is customary in cases of war waged by several allies to conclude agreement or declaration by all belligerents on the same side not to conclude a separate peace with the opposing camp. An example of such an undertaking was included in the alliance treaty concluded between the Papal States, the Duchy of Burgundy and the Republic of Venice, concluded in Rome on Oct. 19, 1463. The parties undertook to launch a crusade against the Turks and to refrain from making peace with the Sultan without the consent of all three parties. Such was the case during the First World War and Second World War.

A declaration to that effect was issued on September 4, 1914 by the British, French and Russian governments, which briefly stated 
The British, French, and Russian Governments mutually engage not to conclude peace separately during the present war. The three Governments agree that when terms of peace come to be discussed, no one of the allies will demand conditions of peace without the previous agreement of each of the other allies.

The Japanese government acceded to this declaration on October 19, 1915.

On November 30, 1915, the same four governments, now joined by the Italian government, issued a similar joint declaration regarding avoiding separate peace.

The obligation to refrain from separate peace was also made during the Second World War in both camps. The Tripartite Pact between the German, Italian and Japanese governments committed the three to prosecute the war together. On the Allied camp, that obligation was contained in the United Nations Declaration of January 1, 1942.

A similar obligation arose within the Arab League in the context of the Arab-Israeli conflict not to reach any separate peace treaty with the Israeli government, in order to assure that a collective arrangement would take into consideration the interests of all Arab states plus the Palestinians. The Egyptian government under Anwar Sadat acted in contrast to that rule when it decided to conclude a separate peace treaty in 1979.

Notes

External links

Law of war
Peace treaties